Scapeghost is a text adventure published by Level 9 Computing in 1989. It was the last text adventure game released by the company.

Description
The player takes the role of police detective Alan Chance, who starts the game watching people disperse from his own funeral. Chance and his colleague Sarah were on an undercover mission, investigating a gang of drug dealers, when they were betrayed by an unknown agent and Chance was killed. Chance has returned as a ghost and finds that Sarah is missing, and his colleagues believe it was Chance's incompetence rather than betrayal that led to his own death. Chance has three nights to solve the crime that cost him his life, restore his reputation and save Sarah.

Components
The game box contains
 floppy disk
 manual
 wall poster
 postcard to be returned for free hint sheet

Release
Level 9 Computing published video games between 1981 and 1991. The idea for Scapeghost was conceived of by Sandra Sharkey and Pete Gerrard, and the game was designed by Pete Austin and programmed by Graham Jones. Box cover art was created by Godfrey Dowson, and computer art was by Dicon Peeke. It was released for Amiga, Amstrad CPC, Amstrad PCW, Atari 8-bit, Atari ST, BBC Micro, Commodore 64, MS-DOS, and ZX Spectrum.

Scapeghost was the last text adventure game released by Level 9.

Reception
In the February–March 1990 edition of Games International, John Harrington commented that "the humour and atmosphere of Scapeghost kept me in good spirits." He concluded by rating the game a below average 6 out of 10, and the graphics a poor 5 out of 10, saying, "Hardened adventurers would probably not  find it too challenging."

In Computer and Video Games #97, Keith Campbell thought the storyline was "very original with some highly unusual puzzles based on the supposed characteristics of ghosts." He noted that the high level commands used by Level 9 made the game "a pleasure to play, and free from frustration even if a silly mistake is made." Campbell concluded with a strong recommendation, saying, "Despite the occasional glitch, I rank Scapeghost as Level 9's most enjoyable adventure."

Reviews
Review in Your Sinclair
Review in ACE

References

External links 
 
 Scapeghost at Lemon Amiga
 

1980s interactive fiction
1989 video games
Amiga games
Amstrad CPC games
Amstrad PCW games
Atari 8-bit family games
Atari ST games
BBC Micro and Acorn Electron games
Commodore 64 games
DOS games
Level 9 Computing games
Video games about ghosts
Video games about police officers
Video games developed in the United Kingdom
ZX Spectrum games